Simon J. Schaffer (born 1 January 1955) is a professor of the history and philosophy of science at the Department of History and Philosophy of Science at the University of Cambridge and was editor of The British Journal for the History of Science from 2004 to 2009.

Early life and education
Schaffer was born in Southampton in 1955. His family moved to Brisbane, Australia that same year, returning to the UK in 1965 to live in Brighton. His father, Bernard, was an academic social scientist who was a professorial fellow at the Institute of Development Studies at the University of Sussex from 1966 until his death in 1984. Simon's mother, Sheila, who died in 2010, was a university librarian and Labour councillor who was Mayor of Brighton in 1995.

Schaffer attended Varndean Grammar School for Boys in Brighton before studying Natural Sciences at Trinity College, Cambridge, specialising in the history and philosophy of science in his final year. While at Trinity, he captained the winning college team in the 1974 University Challenge. After completing his undergraduate degree, Schaffer went to Harvard University for a year as a Kennedy Scholar to study the history of science. He returned to Cambridge in 1976, and gained his PhD in 1980 with the thesis Newtonian cosmology and the steady state.

Career
Schaffer has taught at Imperial College London and the University of California, Los Angeles. Since 1985, he has been a Fellow of Darwin College, Cambridge. He has authored or co-authored numerous books, including Leviathan and the Air-Pump: Hobbes, Boyle, and the Experimental Life with Steven Shapin.
In addition to his work at Cambridge, he has been a presenter on the BBC, in particular the series Light Fantastic broadcast on BBC Four in 2004. He has been a regular contributor and reviewer for the London Review of Books.

Awards and honours
In 2005, Schaffer shared the Erasmus Prize with Steven Shapin for Leviathan and the Air-Pump. In 2013, he received the Sarton Medal, the most prestigious honor awarded by the History of Science Society, in recognition of his "lifetime of scholarly achievement". In 2018, he received the Dan David Prize.

Selected bibliography 

 

Schaffer, Simon (1995). 'Accurate Measurement is an English Science,' The Values of Precision. Princeton, New Jersey: Princeton University Press. .

References

External links 
Schaffer's page on the Department of History and Philosophy of Science website at the University of Cambridge
CBC interview—Ideas: How to Think about Science
 Interviewed by Alan Macfarlane 27 June, continued 1 and 2 July 2008 (video)
 Simon Schaffer's 2010 Tarner Lectures "When the stars threw down their spears": Histories of Astronomy and Empire
 Simon Schaffer's Videos at Imperial College 
Simon Schaffer's contributor page for the London Review of Books
 

British historians
British philosophers
British Jews
Jewish philosophers
1955 births
Living people
Harvard University alumni
Alumni of Trinity College, Cambridge
Fellows of Darwin College, Cambridge
Historians of science
Philosophers of science
Contestants on University Challenge
History journal editors
Kennedy Scholarships